The 1958 Gent–Wevelgem was the 20th edition of the Gent–Wevelgem cycle race and was held on 6 April 1958. The race started in Ghent and finished in Wevelgem. The race was won by Noël Foré.

General classification

References

Gent–Wevelgem
1958 in road cycling
1958 in Belgian sport
April 1958 sports events in Europe